North Chatham is a census-designated place (CDP) in the town of Chatham in Barnstable County, Massachusetts, United States.

References

Chatham, Massachusetts
Census-designated places in Barnstable County, Massachusetts
Census-designated places in Massachusetts
Populated coastal places in Massachusetts